Boxxer, stylised as BOXXER, is a British professional boxing promotional company.

Founded by Ben Shalom, Boxxer began as Ultimate Boxxer, organising eight-man professional boxing elimination tournaments starting in April 2018 and preceding to host a total of six tournaments under the original name. In August 2020, Ultimate Boxxer rebranded to Boxxer, and announced its first signee; the winner of the Ultimate Boxxer 3 tournament, Derrick Osaze. The following month, and under the new branding, Boxxer announced its seventh tournament, "Boxxer Series 7", would take place in November 2020 with a new four-man elimination format.

In June 2021, it was announced that Boxxer had signed a four-year deal with Sky Sports. In September, Boxxer revealed their roster of fighters, including Hughie Fury, Savannah Marshall and Caroline Dubois, as well as co-promotional deals with Claressa Shields and Chris Eubank Jr. A co-promotional deal was also made with Bob Arum's Top Rank in regards to the world title fight between Josh Taylor and Jack Catterall. Boxxer's first event on Sky Sports was a co-promotion with Wasserman Boxing, featuring Eubank Jr. on 2 October 2021.

The most notable, high profile event associated with Boxxer was between domestic rivals Amir Khan Vs Kell Brook on 19 February 2022.

Boxxer Series
Under the name Ultimate Boxxer, the tournament originally featured eight fighters from a given weight competing in 3 x 3 minute rounds in one night, with the winner of the inaugural tournament being awarded £16,000 and a golden robe.

Ultimate Boxxer I
The inaugural tournament was held in the welterweight division and took place on 27 April 2018 at the Manchester Arena. The quarter-finals were streamed live on UNILAD's Facebook page while the semi-finals were and final were aired on 5Spike. The competitors were Andy Kremner (9–0), Isaac Macleod (9–0), Jimmy Cooper (6–0–1), Drew Brown (7–0), Ben Eland (4–0–1), Tom Young (4–0), Kaisee Benjamin (4–0), and Sam Evans (8–0–1). Brown emerged victorious after defeating Young in the final.

Ultimate Boxxer II
The second edition was held in the light-heavyweight division and took place on 2 November 2018 at the indigo at The O2. The prize money was increased to £50,000 with the winner also getting a chance to fight in an eliminator for the British title. The competitors were Joel McIntyre (17–2), Darrell Church (7–2–1), Sam Horsfall (2–1), Dec Spelman (12–1), Shakan Pitters (7–0), Sam Smith (4–1), Jordan Joseph (7–2–1), and Georgii Bacon (1–1), who was a late replacement for John McCallum. Pitters emerged victorious after defeating Spelmen in the final.

Ultimate Boxxer III
Ultimate Boxxer III was held in the middleweight division and took place on 2 May 2019 at the indigo at The O2. The competitors were Tey Lynn-Jones (11–1), Kaan Hawes (4–0–1), Sean Phillips (5–0–1), Grant Dennis (12–1), Kieron Conway (9–0), Josh Groombridge (7–1), Derrick Osaze (6–0) and Joe Hurn (10–0–1). Osaze emerged victorious after defeating Dennis in the final.

Ultimate Boxxer IV
The fourth edition was held in the cruiserweight division and took place on 19 July 2019 at the Planet ice Arena in Altrincham. The competitors were Damian Chambers (7–0), Matt Sen (5–1), Mikael Lawal (9–0), Antony Woolery (1–0), Dan Cooper (7–0–1), David Jamieson (4–0), Tony Conquest (18–3) and Rhasian Earlington (5–0). Lawal emerged victorious after defeating Chambers in the final.

Ultimate Boxxer V
The fifth edition was held in the light-middleweight division and took place on 20 September 2019 at the indigo at The O2 in London, and was aired live on BT Sport. The competitors were Kingsley Egbunike (4–0), Lenny Fuller (6–0), Kaan Hawes (5–1–1), Joshua Ejakpovi (13–1), Lewis Syrett (6–0), Sean Robinson (9–0), Ish O'Connor (2–0) and Steven Donnelly (7–0). Donnelly emerged victorious after defeating Fuller in the final.

Ultimate Boxxer VI
The sixth edition was held in the heavyweight division and took place on 13 December 2019 at the Planet Ice Arena in Manchester. The participants were Nick Webb (13–2), Sean Turner (12–3), Mark Bennett (5–0), Jonathan Palata (7–0), Josh Sandland (4–1–1), Jay McFarlane (10–4), Kamil Sokolowski (7–15–2) and Chris Healey (8–6). Webb emerged victorious after defeating Bennett in the final.

Boxxer VII
The seventh edition of the tournament, now renamed Boxxer, employed a new four-man format. Taking place in the super-middleweight division, the event took place on 10 November 2020 at the BT Sport Studios in London. The participants were Zak Chelli (7–1–1), Harry Woods (4–0), Mike McGoldrick (6–0) and Vladimir Georgiev (4–0). Georgiev was brought in as a late replacement after Ben Ridings tested positive for COVID-19. Chelli emerged victorious after defeating McGoldrick in the final.

Current boxers

|-
|Joshua Buatsi
| English
|Light Heavyweight
|-
|}

References

External links

Boxing television series
British boxing promoters
Sports event promotion companies